Gerald William Balfour, 2nd Earl of Balfour, PC (9 April 1853 – 14 January 1945), known as Gerald Balfour or The Rt Hon. G. W. Balfour until 1930, was a senior British Conservative politician who became a peer on the death of his brother, former prime minister Arthur Balfour, in 1930.

Background and education

Balfour was the fourth son of James Maitland Balfour, of Whittingehame, Haddingtonshire, and Lady Blanche Cecil, daughter of James Gascoyne-Cecil, 2nd Marquess of Salisbury. Two Prime Ministers were immediate relations: Arthur Balfour, 1st Earl of Balfour, his elder brother, and Lord Salisbury, his uncle. He was educated at Eton and at Trinity College, Cambridge, where he gained 1st Class Honours in the Classical Tripos.

Political career
Balfour sat as Conservative Member of Parliament for Leeds Central from 1885 to 1906. During this time he was a member of Commission on Labour, and private secretary to his brother, Arthur Balfour, when he was president of the Local Government Board from 1885 to 1886. He served as Chief Secretary for Ireland from 1895 to 1900, as president of the Board of Trade from 1900 to 1905 and as president of the Local Government Board in 1905. He was admitted to the Privy Council of Ireland in 1895, and to the Privy Council of the United Kingdom in 1905.

After losing his seat in the House of Commons in the Liberal landslide of 1906, he was chairman of the Commission on Lighthouse Administration in 1908, and chairman of the Cambridge Committee of the Commission on Oxford and Cambridge Universities. He succeeded his brother Arthur as second Earl of Balfour in 1930, according to a special remainder in the letters patent and took a seat in the House of Lords.

Personal life and academic honours
During his first spell at the Houses of Parliament, Balfour received an honorary LLD from Cambridge University, and was a fellow of Trinity.

From 1901 Balfour lived at Fisher's Hill House, a large home which he had built by Lutyens in Hook Heath, Woking, Surrey, also living in the rural hamlet by 1911 was Alfred Lyttelton (Lib. U.), Secretary of State for the Colonies (1903–1905) who married into his wider family and the Duke of Sutherland.

Balfour was interested in parapsychology. He was President of the Society for Psychical Research (1906–1907).

Marriage and children
Lord Balfour married Lady Elizabeth Edith "Betty" Bulwer-Lytton, daughter of the 1st Earl of Lytton, former Viceroy of India, in 1887. They had six children:

 Lady Eleanor Balfour (1890 – d. after 1980)
 Lady Ruth Balfour (d. 30 August 1967)
 Mary Edith Balfour (d. 21 January 1894 – 1980)
 Lady Evelyn Barbara "Eve" Balfour (16 July 1898 – 1990)
 Robert Arthur Lytton Balfour, 3rd Earl of Balfour (31 December 1902 – 28 November 1968)
 Lady Kathleen Constance Blanche Balfour (1912 – 20 August 1996).

An affair with Welsh Liberal politician Winifred Coombe Tennant resulted in a further child, Augustus Henry.

The Countess of Balfour died in 1942, aged 74. Lord Balfour survived her by three years and died in January 1945, aged 91, by which time he was the last surviving member of any of long-serving Prime Minister Salisbury's cabinets. He was succeeded in the earldom by his only son Robert.

References

Further reading

 Gerald Balfour. (1908). Some Recent Investigations by the Society for Psychical Research. The Hibbert Journal. 7: 241–260.
 G. E. Cokayne; with Vicary Gibbs, H.A. Doubleday, Geoffrey H. White, Duncan Warrand and Lord Howard de Walden, editors, The Complete Peerage of England, Scotland, Ireland, Great Britain and the United Kingdom, Extant, Extinct or Dormant, new ed., 13 volumes in 14 (1910–1959; reprint in 6 volumes, Gloucester, UK: Alan Sutton Publishing, 2000), volume XIII, p. 373.
 Peter W. Hammond, editor, The Complete Peerage or a History of the House of Lords and All its Members From the Earliest Times, Volume XIV: Addenda & Corrigenda (Stroud, Gloucestershire: Sutton Publishing, 1998), p. 691.
 Charles Mosley, editor, Burke's Peerage and Baronetage, 106th edition, 2 volumes (Crans, Switzerland: Burke's Peerage (Genealogical Books) Ltd, 1999), volume 1, p. 173.

External links

 
 

Balfour, Gerald Balfour, 2nd Earl of
Balfour, Gerald Balfour, 2nd Earl of
Alumni of Trinity College, Cambridge
Chief Secretaries for Ireland
Conservative Party (UK) MPs for English constituencies
Balfour, Gerald Balfour, 2nd Earl of
Balfour, Gerald Balfour, 2nd Earl of
Parapsychologists
People educated at Eton College
UK MPs 1885–1886
UK MPs 1886–1892
UK MPs 1892–1895
UK MPs 1895–1900
UK MPs 1900–1906
UK MPs who inherited peerages
Presidents of the Board of Trade
2